The Anadarko Indians were a minor league baseball team based in Anadarko, Oklahoma for one shortened season. In 1912, the Indians played briefly as members of the Class D level Oklahoma State League before permanently folding during the season. Jim Thorpe had a tryout stint for the Indians and was released, leading him to resume football.

History
In 1912, Anadarko became new members of the Class D level Oklahoma State League, beginning league play in the eight–team league. The Guthrie, Oklahoma, Holdenville Hitters, McAlester Miners, Muskogee Indians, Oklahoma City Senators, Okmulgee Glassblowers and Tulsa Terriers teams joined Anadarko to begin the 1912 season.

The Anadarko use of the "Indians" moniker ties to local history. Today, Anadarko is home to the National Hall of Fame for Famous American Indians, where a sculpture of Jim Thorpe is included in the outdoor walkway of the Hall. Jim Thorpe had tried out for the Andarko Indians as a pitcher, but was released. Thorpe subsequently ran into Carlisle Indian Industrial School classmate and Andarko native Albert Exendine on the street in Andarko, Oklahoma. After a talk, Exendine convinced Thorpe to return to Carlisle to attend school and play football.

The Oklahoma State League began play on April 30, 1912. On June 21, 1912, both the Anadarko Indians and Oklahoma City Senators teams disbanded. Anadarko had a 24–23 record when the team folded. After the two teams folded the league continued play. A second Oklahoma State League schedule was created with replacement clubs placed in Enid, Oklahoma and Eufaula, Oklahoma. Anadarko was relocated to Enid and Oklahoma City to Eufala. The new schedule started and the new Enid team had compiled a 1–4 record when the Oklahoma State League officially disbanded on July 1, 1912.

The standings when the league folded had Anadarko in 3rd place, playing under managers Roy Ellison, Thomas Reed and Ted Price. The final standings were led by Okmulgee Glassblowers (38–10)  followed by the Tulsa Terriers (33–15), Anadarko Indians (24–23), Holdenville Hitters (21–23), McAlester Miners (21–25), McAlester Miners (21–25), Guthrie (15–33) and Oklahoma City Senators (15–33). The Eufaula team was 2–2 and Enid 1–4 under manager Ted Price.

Hi Jasper played for the 1912 Anadarko, Indians.

Anadarko, Oklahoma has not hosted another minor league team.

The ballpark
The name and location of the 1912 Anadarko home ballpark is not directly referenced. The city was founded in 1901, as was Randlett Park, the only known public park in the era.  The park was noted to have a ballfield with grandstands in 1902. The 38.6-acre Randlett Park is still in use with ballfields. The park is named after Col. James R. Randlette, who served as administrator of the Indian Agency in Anadarko from 1899 to 1905. The city was founded in 1901, Randlette secured land from the government for the park that became the present Randlett Park, with park development continuing between 1901 and 1905. The Park is on the National Register of Historic Places. Randlett Park is located at 1934 S W 7th Street, Anadarko, Oklahoma.

Year-by-year record

Notable alumni
Hi Jasper (1912)
Jim Thorpe* (1912)
 Complete roster information for the 1912 Anadarko team is not referenced.

References

External links
 Baseball Reference

Defunct minor league baseball teams
Defunct baseball teams in Oklahoma
Baseball teams established in 1912
Baseball teams disestablished in 1912
Caddo County, Oklahoma